Shahabuddin Hekmatyar is the younger brother of Gulbuddin Hekmatyar, the founder of Hezb-e-Islami Gulbuddin. He was captured by Pakistan undercover police on August 17, 2008. The United States classifies Hezb-e-Islami Gulbuddin as a terrorist organization.

His capture was near Peshawar, on the road between the Shamshato refugee camp and the "University Town".
The Asia Times reported that his capture by Pakistani security officials:

  

His elder brother being underground it was Shahabuddin who announced the death of their mother in April 2003.

Pakistani newspaper The News International reported in January 2009 that Shahabuddin had been recently released after six months in Pakistani custody.
The paper reported that his younger son, Salahuddin, had recently been released from Afghan custody, after three years of detention.
They reported, however, that his elder son, Abdullah Shahab, remained in US custody in Bagram.

References

Year of birth missing (living people)
Living people
Pashtun people
Afghan expatriates in Pakistan